The Best Man to Die is a novel by British crime-writer Ruth Rendell. it was first published in 1969, and is the 4th entry in her popular Inspector Wexford series.

1969 British novels
Novels by Ruth Rendell
Inspector Wexford series
John Long Ltd books